Bruce Ian Bannister (born 14 April 1947) is an English retired professional footballer who played as a striker, and is also a businessperson in sports shoe and apparel sales and distribution.

Football career
Born in Bradford, Bannister played for Leeds United, Bradford City, Bristol Rovers, Plymouth Argyle, Hull City and USL Dunkerque.

While at Bristol Rovers, Bannister and teammate Alan Warboys developed the 'Smash and Grab' method of football.

Business career

Bannister founded Sportsshoes in 1982. In 1985, Sportsshoes launched its mail order service, and later became one of the first retailers to launch an e-commerce website. The business was later taken over by Bannister's son Brett, and became an exclusively online and mail order operation.

References

1947 births
Living people
Footballers from Bradford
Leeds United F.C. players
English footballers
Bradford City A.F.C. players
Bristol Rovers F.C. players
Plymouth Argyle F.C. players
Hull City A.F.C. players
USL Dunkerque players
English Football League players
Association football forwards
English expatriate footballers
English expatriates in France
Expatriate footballers in France